Song Jae-rim (born February 18, 1985) is a South Korean actor and model. He began his career as a runway model for the Seoul collections of Juun. J, Herin Homme and Ha Sang Beg. He has also appeared in the magazines Bazaar Korea, Vogue Girl Korea, Dazed & Confused Korea, Nylon Korea, GQ Korea, Arena Homme + Korea, Esquire Korea, and Marie Claire Korea.

Song began acting in 2009, and his notable roles include a loyal bodyguard in the period drama Moon Embracing the Sun (2012), and a cold-blooded assassin in Two Weeks (2013). He shot to fame after appearing in the fourth season of We Got Married with Kim So-eun.

Filmography

Film

Television series

Web series

Television show

Music video

Awards and nominations

References

External links
 
 
 
 

1985 births
Living people
21st-century South Korean male actors
South Korean male film actors
South Korean male television actors
South Korean male models
South Korean male web series actors
Male actors from Seoul
Models from Seoul
Chung-Ang University alumni